Body integrity dysphoria (BID, also referred to as body integrity identity disorder, amputee identity disorder and xenomelia, formerly called apotemnophilia) is a mental disorder characterized by a desire to have a sensory or physical disability or having discomfort with being able-bodied beginning in early adolescence and resulting in harmful consequences. BID appears to be related to somatoparaphrenia. People with this condition may refer to themselves as "transabled".

Signs and symptoms
BID is a rare, infrequently studied condition in which there is a mismatch between the mental body image and the physical body, characterized by an intense desire for amputation or paralysis of a limb, usually a leg, or to become blind or deaf. The person sometimes has a sense of sexual arousal connected with the desire for loss of a limb, movement, or sense.

Some act out their desires, by pretending they are amputees using prostheses and other tools to ease their desire to be one, by using a wheelchair or by pretending they are blind or deaf. Some people with BID have reported to the media or by interview with researchers that they have resorted to self-amputation of a "superfluous" limb by, for example, allowing a train to run over it or otherwise damaging it so severely that surgeons will have to amputate it. However, the medical literature records few, if any, cases of self-amputation. There has been, however, at least one apparently well-documented example.

To the extent that generalizations can be made, people with BID appear to start to wish for amputation when they are young, between eight and twelve years of age, and often knew a person with an amputated limb when they were children; however, people with BID tend to seek treatment only when they are much older. People with BID seem to be predominantly male, and while there is no evidence that sexual preference is relevant, there does seem to be a correlation with BID and a person having a paraphilia; there appears to be a weak correlation with personality disorders. Family psychiatric history does not appear to be relevant, and there does not appear to be any strong correlation with the site of the limb or limbs that the person wishes they did not have, nor with any past trauma to the undesired limb.

Causes
As of 2014 the cause was not clear and was a subject of ongoing research.
However a small sample of people with body integrity dysphoria connected to their left leg have had MRI scans that showed less gray matter in the right side of their superior parietal lobule. The amount of gray matter missing was correlated to the strength of the patients' desire to remove their leg.

Diagnosis
In the ICD-11, BID is included under the category "Disorders of bodily distress or bodily experience". It is  "characterised by an intense and persistent desire to become physically disabled in a significant way (e.g. major limb amputee, paraplegic, blind), with onset by early adolescence accompanied by persistent discomfort, or intense feelings of inappropriateness concerning current non-disabled body configuration. The desire to become physically disabled results in harmful consequences, as manifested by either the preoccupation with the desire (including time spent pretending to be disabled) significantly interfering with productivity, with leisure activities, or with social functioning (e.g. person is unwilling to have a close relationships because it would make it difficult to pretend) or by attempts to actually become disabled have resulted in the person putting his or her health or life in significant jeopardy. The disturbance is not better accounted for by another mental, behavioural or neurodevelopmental disorder, by a Disease of the Nervous System or by another medical condition, or by Malingering." A diagnosis of gender dysphoria must be ruled out.

Classification
Prior to the release of the ICD-11, the diagnosis of BID as a mental disorder was controversial. There was debate about including it in the DSM-5, and it was not included; it was also not included in the ICD-10. It has been included in the ICD-11, which reached a stable version in June 2018, as 'Body integrity dysphoria' with code 6C21.

Treatment
There is no evidence-based treatment for BID; there are reports of the use of cognitive behavioral therapy and antidepressants.

The ethics of surgically amputating the undesired limb of a person with BID are difficult and controversial.

Prognosis
Outcomes of treated and untreated BID are not known; there are numerous case reports that amputation permanently resolves the desire in affected individuals.

Transability 
Transability (which can also be referred to as being trans-able) is the term used to describe an able-bodied person's need to alter his or her body in order to develop a physical impairment or disability. This is influenced by personal decision and desire.
According to ISH News, trans able people go through the process by physically injuring themselves in a way that causes lifelong disabilities, satisfying their aspiration to be disabled.  
The transable person could want to become deaf, blind, amputee, paraplegic or anything else.

History
Apotemnophilia was first described in a 1977 article by psychologists Gregg Furth and John Money as primarily sexually oriented. In 1986 Money described a similar condition he called acrotomophilia; namely, sexual arousal in response to a partner's amputation. Publications before 2004 were generally case studies. The condition received public attention in the late 1990s after Scottish surgeon Robert Smith amputated limbs of two otherwise healthy people who were desperate to have this done.

In 2004 Michael First published the first clinical research in which he surveyed fifty-two people with the condition, a quarter of whom had undergone an amputation. Based on that work, First coined the term "body integrity identity disorder" to express what he saw as more of an identity disorder than a paraphilia. After First's work, efforts to study BID as a neurological condition looked for possible causes in the brains of people with BID using neuroimaging and other techniques. Research provisionally found that people with BID were more likely to want removal of a left limb than right, consistent with damage to the right parietal lobe; in addition, skin conductance response is significantly different above and below the line of desired amputation, and the line of desired amputation remains stable over time, with the desire often beginning in early childhood. This work did not completely explain the condition, and psychosexual research has been ongoing as well.

See also
 Abasiophilia
 Armless
 Attraction to disability
 Body dysmorphic disorder
 Body modification
 Disability pretenders
 Gender identity disorder
 Penectomy
 Quid Pro Quo
 Silver Spring monkeys
 Whole

References

Further reading

External links
 Complete Obsession, a Horizon episode on BIID (transcript)
https://www.okwhatever.org/topics/selfie/biid

Amputations
Types of mental disorders
Sexology